Tove Goltermann Søby (née Nielsen, born January 23, 1933) is a Danish sprint canoer who competed in the 1950s.

She won a silver medal in the K-1 500 m event at the 1954 ICF Canoe Sprint World Championships in Mâcon.

She won a bronze medal in the K-1 500 m event at the 1956 Summer Olympics in Melbourne.

She was born in Copenhagen.

References
 Sports-reference.com profile
 
 

1933 births
Living people
Danish female canoeists
Olympic canoeists of Denmark
Canoeists at the 1956 Summer Olympics
Olympic bronze medalists for Denmark
Olympic medalists in canoeing
ICF Canoe Sprint World Championships medalists in kayak
Medalists at the 1956 Summer Olympics
Sportspeople from Copenhagen